The 2001–02 Belarusian Extraliga season was the tenth season of the Belarusian Extraliga, the top level of ice hockey in Belarus. Eight teams participated in the league, and HK Keramin Minsk won the championship.

Regular season

Group A

Group B

Playoffs
Quarterfinals
HK Keramin Minsk - HK Brest 2-0 on series
HK Neman Grodno - Polimir Novopolotsk 2-0 on series
HK Gomel - HK Yunost Minsk 2-0 on series
HK Khimvolokno Mogilev - HK Vitebsk 2-0 on series
Semifinals
HK Keramin Minsk - HK Neman Grodno 3-0 on series
HK Khimvolonko Mogilev - HK Gomel 3-2 on series
Final
HK Keramin Minsk - HK Khimvolokno Mogilev 3-0 on series

External links 
 Season on hockeyarchives.info

Belarusian Extraleague
Belarusian Extraleague seasons
Extra